The Montana Grizzlies football program is a college football team that represents the University of Montana in the National Collegiate Athletic Association's Big Sky Conference.  This is a list of the program's head coaches since the program's inception in 1897.

References

Lists of college football head coaches

Montana sports-related lists